is a Japanese former professional motorcycle racer. He competed in Grand Prix motorcycle racing from 1991 to 1999.
Sakata is notable being a two-time F.I.M. 125cc world champion.

Motorcycle racing career
Sakata began his Grand Prix career in 1991 and by the 1993 season, finished second to Dirk Raudies in the 125cc class on a Honda. In 1994, he became the first Japanese rider to race for a European factory when he signed with the Aprilia factory. He repaid them by winning the 125cc championship that year. He repeated as champion in 1998 after a tight points battle with Tomomi Manako and Marco Melandri. He retired after the 1999 season.

Motorcycle Grand Prix results
(key) (Races in bold indicate pole position)

References 

Japanese motorcycle racers
125cc World Championship riders
1966 births
Living people
Sportspeople from Tokyo
125cc World Riders' Champions